Rhagio notatus is a Palearctic species of snipe fly in the family Rhagionidae.

References

Rhagionidae
Insects described in 1820